Thalavattam is a 1986 Indian Malayalam-language drama film written and directed by Priyadarshan, starring Mohanlal, Lizy, M. G. Soman and Karthika. The film is very loosely based on the 1975 movie One Flew Over the Cuckoo's Nest  which was an adaptation of the 1962 novel of the same name by Ken Kesey. The film features songs composed by Raghu Kumar and C. Rajamani, and a score by Johnson. The story follows Vinod, an eccentric new patient at a mental asylum.

The film was remade in Hindi as Kyon Ki (2005) by Priyadarshan and in Tamil as Manasukkul Mathappu (1988) by Robert–Rajasekar.

Plot 
Vinod becomes mentally ill after his girlfriend Anitha dies due to an electric short circuit accident during a rock concert. Vinod is admitted to a mental hospital managed by Dr. Ravindran, in Ooty. Dr Ravindran is aggressive and a sadist who has a dislike for Vinod.

With the help of Dr. Savithri, who is Dr. Ravindran's daughter, and Dr. Unnikrishnan, a very old and close acquaintance of Vinod from his childhood, he slowly regains his memory and mental equilibrium. Savithri and Vinod fall in love. Dr. Ravindran has already arranged Savithri's marriage with Hari and so he opposes the lovers.

When he finds that Savithri and Vinod are adamant, Dr. Ravindran lobotomises Vinod and puts him in a state of coma. Dr. Unnikrishnan feels that death would be preferable over a vegetative life and kills Vinod. He confronts Dr. Ravindran and confesses to the euthanasia. Savithri overhears the conversation, and loses her mental equilibrium. She is admitted into the same institution as a patient.

Cast 
Mohanlal as Vinod Kumar ('Vinu') a mental patient and protagonist of film
Mukesh as Hari ('Chukkan'), Savithri's cousin
Nedumudi Venu as Dr. Unnikrishnan ('Unniettan')
M. G. Soman as Dr. Ravindran Varma, a cruel and aggressive man who has a hatred against Vinod
Karthika as Savithri, Dr. Ravindran's daughter, and Vinod's new love partner.
Lizy as Anitha, Vinod's Girlfriend
Jagathi Sreekumar as Narayanan
Cochin Haneefa as Antony, an Aggressive Hospital Attendant
Sukumari as Nurse Rachel
G. P. Vijayakumar as Satheesh, Vinod's brother
K. P. A. C. Sunny as Retd. Judge Melepattil Govindan Kumar, Vinod's father
KPAC Lalitha as Subhadra kunjamma, a Mental Patient
Thikkurissy Sukumaran Nair as 'Appoopan', a  Mental Patient
Maniyanpilla Raju as Joseph, a Mental Patient
 Sankaradi as Thirumeni, a Mental Patient

Soundtrack

Reception 
In 2002, comparing the film to One Flew over the Cuckoo's Nest, S. Santosh of The Hindu wrote, "Director Priyadarsan's syrupy Malayalam adaptation of the classic, Thalavattam, saw Mohanlal in his usual mainstream self. Had he seen the film, even Jack Nicholson would have been surprised: after all, the Hollywood actor has not mastered the art of running around trees."

Thalavattam was released in Kerala in 12 centres on 10 locations. The film performed well at the box office, becoming one the highest-grossing Malayalam films of the year. It was made on a shoestring budget of ₹20 lakh. The film ran over 100 days in theatres.

Remakes 
Thalavattam was remade in Hindi as Kyon Ki directed by Priyadarshan himself in 2005. The film was also remade in Tamil in 1988 by Robert–Rajasekar as Manasukkul Mathappu, with Prabhu and Saranya playing the lead.

References

External links 
 

1986 films
1980s Malayalam-language films
Indian drama films
Films set in psychiatric hospitals
Films shot in Ooty
Malayalam films remade in other languages
Films scored by Raghu Kumar
Films scored by Rajamani
Films directed by Priyadarshan